Drukgyegang, more commonly written as Drujegang, and in the past also as Dujeygang, is a village in Drujegang Gewog in  south-western Bhutan. It is located in Dagana District. The village started as a trading post around the present Drujegang High School, a government school with boarding facilities. 

At the 2005 census, its population was 552.

References 

Populated places in Bhutan